Los Pedroches is a natural region and comarca in Córdoba Province, Andalusia, southern Spain. It is located in the Sierra Morena area at the northern end of the province. The main town is Pozoblanco.

The climate of the comarca is continental. It is the northernmost Andalusian territory. The name of the present-day official comarca is Los Pedroches.
https://www.diariocordoba.com/opinion/2008/08/08/mal-llamado-valle-pedroches-38255107.html

Municipalities
Alcaracejos
Añora
Belalcázar
Cardeña
Venta del Charco
Azuel
Conquista
Dos Torres
El Guijo
El Viso
Fuente la Lancha
Hinojosa del Duque
Pedroche
Pozoblanco
Santa Eufemia
Torrecampo
Villanueva del Duque
Villaralto
Villanueva de Córdoba

See also
Comarcas of Andalusia
Pedroche

References

External links

 Mancomunidad de Municipios de Los Pedroches
 Coordinadora de Los Pedroches
 Solienses. Cultura de Los Pedroches
 Villanueva del Duque
 Festival de Música Jóven de los Pedroches
 los Pedroches Tourism

Natural regions of Spain
Comarcas of Andalusia
Geography of the Province of Córdoba (Spain)
Sierra Morena